Reylynn Caster (born March 3, 2003) is an American actress best known for the role of  Faith Newman on The Young and the Restless as of April 2021.

Early life
Caster was born in Wichita, Kansas. Her family moved to Los Angeles in 2015 so she could pursue her acting career.

Career
After starting her acting career in local music theater, Caster made her first appearance in a national television commercial at the age of 7 with Leif Jonker, director of the cult horror film, Darkness.  While in Kansas she appeared in independent films Wichita, Bender, and The Matchbreaker.

An audition for the movie Logan raised the interest of a Los Angeles-based talent agency which signed her to their roster.

Within six months of moving to Los Angeles in the fall of 2015, she appeared in the ABC sitcom Speechless, and the Amazon Prime series Just Add Magic and landed her first series regular role on the CBS sitcom Me, Myself & I as the love interest of Jack Dylan Grazer, opposite veteran actors Bobby Moynihan, Jaleel White, John Larroquette, and Sharon Lawrence.

In 2020, she played Lola Wight, oldest daughter of WWE superstar Big Show (Paul Wight) on The Big Show Show, debuting on April 6, 2020, on Netflix, where she was one of three with ties to Wichita.  Paul Wight played college basketball at Wichita State University and showrunner and co-creator of the show, Jason Berger, spent much of his early life in the Midwestern city.

In April 2021, Caster took over the role of Faith Newman on The Young and the Restless  replacing Alyvia Alyn Lind.

Filmography

Film

Television

References

External links
 

2003 births
Living people
Actresses from Kansas
American television actresses
21st-century American actresses